Henry Horne may refer to:

Henry Horne (MP) for Kent in 1404
Henry Horne, 1st Baron Horne (1861–1929), British Army officer
Henry Horne (Australian politician) (1872–1955), New South Wales politician
Henry Horne (basketball), American basketball player

See also
Henry Horn (disambiguation)